Events from the year 1752 in Sweden:

Incumbents
 Monarch – Adolf Frederick

Events

 The Riksdag of the Estates introduce a reform in which the Privy Council Chancellery is henceforth to be elected without the participation of the monarch.  
 The spinning schools which had been established through the 1739 reform are given government support, and medals are created for spinning mistresses to encourage the textile industry.
 The first modern hospital, Serafimerlasarettet, is founded.

Births

 8 September – Carl Stenborg, opera singer (died 1813)
 12 December – Nils von Rosenstein, civil servant and propagator for enlightenment thinking (died 1824)
 Barbara Pauli, fashion trader and milliner (approximate year)

Deaths

  9 February Fredrik Hasselqvist, traveller and naturalist (born 1722) 
 Elisabet Fritz, industrialist
 Christina Piper, politically active countess, builder and industrialist (born 1673)

References

 
Years of the 18th century in Sweden
Sweden